Lophostigma is a genus of flowering plants belonging to the family Sapindaceae.

Its native range is Western South America.

Species:

Lophostigma plumosum 
Lophostigma schunkei

References

Sapindaceae
Sapindaceae genera